On May 4–6, 1960, a large tornado outbreak sequence affected parts of the Midwestern and Southern United States. The severe weather event produced at least 71 confirmed tornadoes, including five violent tornadoes in the U.S. state of Oklahoma. Major tornado activity began on the afternoon of May 4, with strong tornadoes affecting the Red River Valley and the Dallas-Fort Worth Metroplex. Two tornadoes struck parts of southern Oklahoma, causing significant damage to the Konawa and Soper areas. In all, at least 22 tornadoes formed between the early afternoon and late evening hours, with two more tornadoes forming early on May 5, shortly after midnight CDT. A much more significant tornado outbreak began on the afternoon of May 5 and continued overnight, spreading from eastern Oklahoma into portions of southern Missouri and Central Arkansas. At least 35 tornadoes developed between 6:00 a.m. CST on May 5–6, including a long-tracked F5 that struck rural areas in Northeastern Oklahoma and killed five people. Two other tornadoes killed 21 people in and near Sequoyah County in the eastern portion of the state. Other strong tornadoes affected the Little Rock metropolitan area early on May 6 in Arkansas. In all, the tornado outbreak sequence killed 33 people and injured 302.

Background

Confirmed tornadoes

May 4 event

May 5 event

May 6 event

See also
List of North American tornadoes and tornado outbreaks
Tornado outbreak sequence of April 28 – May 2, 1953

Notes

References

F5 tornadoes by date
 ,1960-05-04
Tornadoes of 1960
Tornadoes in Texas
Tornadoes in Oklahoma
Tornadoes in Kansas
Tornadoes in Arkansas
Tornadoes in Alabama
Tornadoes in Nebraska
Tornadoes in Missouri
Tornadoes in Iowa
Tornadoes in Illinois
Tornadoes in Mississippi
1960 in Oklahoma
Natural disasters in Oklahoma
May 1960 events in the United States
1960 natural disasters in the United States